The 1540s decade ran from 1 January 1540, to 31 December 1549.

References